Björn Olsen (born 8 April 1946) is an Icelandic alpine skier. He competed in two events at the 1968 Winter Olympics.

References

1946 births
Living people
Icelandic male alpine skiers
Olympic alpine skiers of Iceland
Alpine skiers at the 1968 Winter Olympics
20th-century Icelandic people